An Intimate Story is a 1981 Israeli drama directed by Nadav Levitan. It was based on a short story written by Levitan and filmed in its entirety on Kibbutz Einat.

Plot
The film follows a married couple, Leah (Chava Alberstein) and Ya'akov (Alexander Peleg), who live on a kibbutz in the 1970s. Over a period of ten years, all of their attempts to conceive a child have been unsuccessful and their marriage begins to disintegrate as each suffers silently and blames the other. Their difficulties are compounded – and the damaging effects of the lack of privacy in an insular communal environment underscored – when their inability to conceive becomes a matter of public knowledge and gossip among the kibbutz members.

Cast
Chava Alberstein as Leah Gootman
Alexander Peleg as Ya'akov
Dan Toren
Gilat Ankori
Peter Freistadt
Shmuel Shilo
Shmuel Wolf

Production
Levitan met his future wife, Chava Alberstein, on the set of the film.

References

External links
 

1981 films
1980s Hebrew-language films
Films about the kibbutz
Films directed by Nadav Levitan
1981 drama films
Israeli drama films
Films set in the 1970s